Thomas Julius Brown (August 18, 1915 – November 22, 1973) was an American Negro league shortstop from 1939 to 1950.

A native of Des Moines, Iowa, Brown attended East Moline High School in East Moline, Illinois. He made his Negro leagues debut in 1939 for the Memphis Red Sox, and spent the majority of his career with the club, playing his final season with Memphis in 1950. Brown was selected to play in the East–West All-Star Game in 1942, and spent 1946 out of baseball serving in the United States Army. After his Negro leagues career, he went on to play minor league baseball through 1953. Brown died in East Moline in 1973 at age 58.

References

External links
 and Baseball-Reference Black Baseball stats and Seamheads

1915 births
1973 deaths
Chicago American Giants players
Indianapolis Clowns players
Memphis Red Sox players
United States Army soldiers
African-American United States Army personnel
20th-century African-American sportspeople
Baseball infielders